Jatav is a surname. Notable people with the surname include:
Barelal Jatav (born 1953), Indian politician
Chetram Jatav, Indian freedom fighter
Gopilal Jatav (born 1948), Indian politician
Jairam Jatav (born 1955), Indian politician
Jasmant Jatav, Indian politician
Kamlesh Jatav, Indian politician
Kammodilal Jatav (1929–2005), Indian politician
Manik Chand Jatav-vir (1897–?), Dalit activist
Ramji Gautam, Indian politician
Supriya Jatav (born 1991), Indian Karateka
Susmita Bauri (born 1975), Indian politician
Than Singh Jatav, Indian politician

Hindustani-language surnames
Surnames of Hindustani origin